The 2023 Nigerian Senate elections in Kaduna State will be held on 25 February 2023, to elect the 3 federal Senators from Kaduna State, one from each of the state's three senatorial districts. The elections will coincide with the 2023 presidential election, as well as other elections to the Senate and elections to the House of Representatives; with state elections being held two weeks later. Primaries were held between 4 April and 9 June 2022.

Background
In the previous Senate elections, only one incumbent senator was returned: in the South district, Danjuma Laah (PDP) was re-elected but Shehu Sani (PRP-Central) and Suleiman Othman Hunkuyi (PDP-North) both lost re-election. In the South district, Laah held his seat with 64% of the vote; both of the open seats were won back by APC as Uba Sani won the North district with 56% and Suleiman Abdu Kwari gained the Central seat with 68% of the vote. These results were a part of a slight swing to the Kaduna APC as most House of Representatives seats were won by the party, it won a majority in the House of Assembly, and Buhari won the state in the presidential election.

Overview

Summary

Kaduna Central 

The Kaduna Central Senatorial District covers the local government areas of Birnin Gwari, Chikun, Giwa, Igabi, Kaduna North, Kaduna South, and Kajuru. The incumbent Uba Sani (APC) was elected with 55.8% of the vote in 2019. In March 2022, Sani announced that he would run for governor of Kaduna State instead of seeking re-election.

Primary elections

All Progressives Congress 

The APC senatorial primary was heavily affected by the party's gubernatorial primary. The Governor Nasir Ahmad el-Rufai-aligned camp of the Kaduna APC (which Sani was a part of) held an endorsement process to decide on a single gubernatorial candidate from former commissioner Muhammad Sani Abdullahi, Senator Uba Sani, and Deputy Governor Hadiza Sabuwa Balarabe; eventually Sani was selected as the gubernatorial candidate while Abdullahi was to run to replace Sani in the Senate and Balarabe would become Sani's running mate. Abdullahi promptly withdrew from the gubernatorial race and entered the senatorial primary in early May. On the primary date, an indirect primary resulted Abdullahi being nominated unopposed as the two other candidates—Rabi Salisu and Usman Garba—withdrew.

People's Democratic Party 

On the primary date, Lawal Adamu Usman—the 2019 nominee—defeating runner-up Usman Ibrahim and four other candidates to emerge victorious. However, the state party initially annulled the primary, citing the National Assembly Appeal Committee's report and recommendation. The party later backtracked and accepted Usman as nominee despite protests from Ibrahim who claimed to have video evidence of over-voting during the primary. Ibrahim went onto sue the PDP for a new primary; Justice Muhammed Umar of a Federal High Court ruled in favor of Ibrahim on 2 November and ordered a new primary to be conducted. The new primary was held on 8 November with Ibrahim defeating Usman and four other candidates by a wide margin; however, the state PDP noted that Usman would be reinstated as nominee if his judicial appeal was successful. On 17 February, the Supreme Court ruled in favor of Usman, reinstating him as nominee just about a week before the election.

Campaign 
During the primary period, pundits viewed the Central district as the most competitive of Kaduna's senate seats as observers noted that the lack of Sani's incumbency advantage had boosted PDP prospects. However, early November brought a new surprise to the race as Usman was removed as PDP nominee by a court ruling that annulled its primary due to overvoting and ordered a new primary to be conducted. Usman lost the rerun primary to Ibrahim; however, the state PDP noted that Usman would be reinstated as nominee if his judicial appeal was successful.

In terms of the general election campaign, reporting from The Nation labeled the seat as a bellwether for the state at-large. The analysis also labeled Abdullahi as the frontrunner due to the PDP infighting and court battle. Just about a week before the election, the Supreme Court ruled in favor of Usman, reinstating him as PDP nominee.

General election

Results

Kaduna North 

The Kaduna North Senatorial District covers the local government areas of Ikara, Kubau, Kudan, Lere, Makarfi, Sabon Gari, Soba, and Zaria. The incumbent Suleiman Abdu Kwari (APC), who was elected with 67.7% of the vote in 2019, is seeking re-election.

Primary elections

All Progressives Congress 

The primary was beset by violence when armed assailants attacked the Zaria venue during voting, injuring several delegates and stealing journalists' cameras and electronics. Nonetheless, the results were announced later that day with Kwari winning renomination nearly unanimously. Both of his challengers—Haliru Ibrahim and Turad Sani Sha'aban (son of former MHR Sani Sha'aban and son-in-law of President Muhammadu Buhari)—rejected the results with Ibrahim suing the party while groups opposed to Kwari called for Kwari's disqualification. By September, hearings began on Ibrahim's suit to have himself declared the legitimate nominee.

People's Democratic Party 

The primary resulted in the sole candidate—Khalid Mustapha—winning the nomination by affirmation. After the primary, Mustapha expressed gratitude to the delegates and urged party members to work for a general election victory.

Campaign 
During the primary period, observers noted that the PDP seemed not to be strongly contesting the seat due to its strong APC lean. By December 2022, that analysis remained due to Kwari's reported strength as a candidate along with potential vote splitting between the PDP and NNPP.

General election

Results

Kaduna South 

The Kaduna South Senatorial District covers the local government areas of Jaba, Jema'a, Kachia, Kagarko, Kaura, Kauru, Sanga, and Zangon Kataf; it is largely coterminous with the Southern Kaduna region, noted for its ethnic diversity and Christian majority in a state that is mainly ethnic Hausa-Fulani and majority Muslim. Incumbent Danjuma Laah (PDP) was elected with 64.4% of the vote in 2019 and sought re-election but lost the PDP nomination.

Primary elections

All Progressives Congress 

On the primary date, an indirect primary in Kafanchan ended with Bulus Audu—an aide to Governor Nasir Ahmad el-Rufai—emerging as the nominee by voice vote after his sole opponent—Anthony Hassan—withdrew right before the primary. In his acceptance speech, Audu thanked Hassan and delegates before vowing to bring development to the district.

People's Democratic Party 

The primary, held in Kafanchan, resulted in Laah losing the nomination to Sunday Marshall Katunɡ—former House of Representatives member for Zangon Kataf/Jaba. Katunɡ received 112 votes compared to Laah's 74 votes and third place MHR Shehu Nicholas Garba's 52 votes.

Campaign 
During the primary period, observers noted that the APC seemed not to be strongly contesting the seat due to its strong PDP lean. However, by December 2022, reporting from The Nation categorized the election as newly competitive due to the lack of incumbent and the rise of the LP in the region.

General election

Results

See also 
 2023 Nigerian Senate election
 2023 Nigerian elections

References 

Kaduna State senatorial elections
2023 Kaduna State elections
Kaduna State Senate elections